is a Japanese athlete specialising in the javelin throw. She represented her country at the 2017 World Championships. In addition, she won the silver medal at the 2017 Summer Universiade.

Her personal best in the event is 62.37 metres set in Taipei in 2017.

International competitions

References

1995 births
Living people
Japanese female javelin throwers
Asian Games competitors for Japan
Athletes (track and field) at the 2018 Asian Games
World Athletics Championships athletes for Japan
Universiade medalists in athletics (track and field)
Universiade silver medalists for Japan
Medalists at the 2017 Summer Universiade
Japan Championships in Athletics winners
21st-century Japanese women